Margaret Therese Girvan (2 October 1932 – 7 January 1979) was a Scottish swimmer. Girvan competed for Great Britain in the 400 metre and 4 × 100 metres freestyle events at the 1956 Olympics and reached the final in the relay. She represented Scotland at the British Empire Games in 1950, 1954 and 1958 and won one gold and two bronze medals. She won the 1956 ASA National Championship 440 yards freestyle title.

References

1932 births
1979 deaths
British female swimmers
Olympic swimmers of Great Britain
Swimmers at the 1956 Summer Olympics
Place of birth missing
Commonwealth Games medallists in swimming
Commonwealth Games gold medallists for Scotland
Commonwealth Games bronze medallists for Scotland
Swimmers at the 1950 British Empire Games
Swimmers at the 1954 British Empire and Commonwealth Games
Medallists at the 1950 British Empire Games
Medallists at the 1954 British Empire and Commonwealth Games
Scottish female swimmers